Aural 6 is an EP by Counting Crows released on November 27, 2008. The Best Buy-exclusive compilation sampler contains tracks from several of their previous albums. This was one of a series of six-song EPs released at Best Buy for $5.99 for Black Friday, 2008.

Track listing
"Mr. Jones" (David Bryson and Adam Duritz) – 4:33 (Originally from August and Everything After)
"A Long December" (Duritz) – 4:57 (Originally from Recovering the Satellites)
"Colorblind" (Charles Gillingham and Duritz) – 3:23 (Originally from This Desert Life)
"Hard Candy" (Gillingham, Duritz, and Dan Vickrey) – 4:20 (Originally from Hard Candy)
"Hanging Tree" (Duritz and Vickrey) – 3:50 (Originally from Saturday Nights & Sunday Mornings)
"Washington Square" – 4:17 (Originally from Saturday Nights & Sunday Mornings)

Although the photo montage on the cover displays Across a Wire: Live in New York City, no tracks from that album appear on this compilation.

Personnel
Counting Crows
Jim Bogios – drums and percussion on "Hanging Tree" and "Washington Square"
David Bryson – guitar
Adam Duritz – vocals, piano on "A Long December"
Charles Gillingham – piano, Hammond B-3 organ, Mellotron, synthesizer, vocals
David Immerglück – guitar
Matt Malley – bass guitar on "A Long December", "Hard Candy", and "Mr. Jones"
Ben Mize – drums on "Hard Candy"
Millard Powers – bass guitar on "Hanging Tree" and upright double bass on "Washington Square"
Dan Vickrey – guitars

Additional musicians
Denny Fongheiser – drums and percussion on "Mr. Jones"
David Gibbs – backing vocals on "Hard Candy"
Matthew Sweet – backing vocals on "Hard Candy"

Production
"Colorblind" – Dennis Herring and David Lowery
"Hanging Tree" – Gil Norton
"Hard Candy" – Steve Lillywhite
"A Long December" – Gil Norton
"Mr. Jones" – T-Bone Burnett
"Washington Square" – Brian Deck

External links
Discogs

2008 EPs
Albums produced by Brian Deck
Albums produced by David Lowery (musician)
Albums produced by Dennis Herring
Albums produced by Gil Norton
Albums produced by Steve Lillywhite
Albums produced by T Bone Burnett
Albums with cover art by Dave McKean
Counting Crows compilation albums
DGC Records albums
Sampler albums
2008 compilation albums